LaSalle Fish and Wildlife Area is a protected area that covers  dedicated to providing hunting and fishing opportunities. It is located south on County Road 650W, near Lake Village, Indiana on the Kankakee River.

Wildlife
During the spring migration (March), waterfowl are at their peak abundance. Hunting is permitted during the appropriate seasons.

Facilities
Wildlife Viewing
Picnicking
Ice Fishing
Hunting
Trapping
Dog Training Area
Boat Ramp

References

Parks in Indiana
Protected areas of Newton County, Indiana
Protected areas of Lake County, Indiana